Xin'an Subdistrict may refer to:
Xin'an Subdistrict, Shenzhen, in Bao'an District
Xin'an Subdistrict, Mudanjiang, in Dong'an District, Mudanjiang, Heilongjiang
Xin'an Subdistrict, Qitaihe, in Xinxing District, Qitaihe, Heilongjiang
Xin'an Subdistrict, Shuangyashan, in Baoshan District, Shuangyashan, Heilongjiang
Xin'an Subdistrict, Wuxi, in Binhu District, Wuxi, Jiangsu
Xin'an Subdistrict, Huichun, Jilin
Xin'an Subdistrict, Jilin City, in Longtan District, Jilin City
Xin'an Subdistrict, Anqiu, Shandong
Xin'an Subdistrict, Qingdao (辛安街道), in Huangdao District
Xin'an Subdistrict, Quzhou (信安街道), in Kecheng District, Quzhou, Zhejiang